Legacy is the eleventh studio album by British heavy metal band, Girlschool, released on Wacken Records in 2008. This album celebrates the 30th anniversary of Girlschool, making it the longest running all-female metal band in activity. A few musicians that the band befriended in the many years of incessant touring lent a hand in completing the recording. The song "Legend" is dedicated to Kelly Johnson, the former Girlschool guitarist who died in 2007.

Track listing

Personnel
Girlschool
Kim McAuliffe – lead and backing vocals, rhythm guitar
Jackie Chambers – lead guitar, backing vocals
Enid Williams – lead and backing vocals, bass
Denise Dufort – drums
Kelly Johnson – "ghost" appearance

Guest musicians
Eddie Ojeda – lead guitar and solo on "Spend Spend Spend" 
Neil Murray – bass on "Whole New World" and "Legend" 
Phil Campbell – guitar solo on "Whole New World", guitar solo on "Just Another Day", guitar on "Zeitgeist"
"Fast" Eddie Clarke – guitar solo on "Metropolis" 
J.J. French – guitar solo on "Don't Mess Around" 
Lemmy Kilmister – bass, vocals and triangle on "Don't Talk To Me"
Ronnie James Dio – vocals on "I Spy (Dio/Iommi Mix)"
Tony Iommi – lead guitar on "I Spy (Dio/Iommi Mix)"

Production
Tim Hamill – producer, engineer
Rudy Sarzo – engineer for Ronnie James Dio

References

External links
Official Girlschool discography

2008 albums
Girlschool albums